Men's association football (soccer) was contested at the 1904 Summer Olympics. A total of three club teams competed, two representing the United States, both from host city St. Louis, and one representing Canada, from Galt (now Cambridge), Ontario. Originally, two other Canadian teams had also been entered in the competition, Berlin Rangers and the University of Toronto, but both withdrew before the draw. 

The 1904 Olympic Games were spread over several months, linked to the St. Louis World's Fair, and football, in November, was the last sport to be contested. The tournament was played as a straight round-robin, although the game between Christian Brothers College and St. Rose Parish was replayed due to a draw in their first game.

Gold medals were awarded at these Olympics for the first time. Galt F.C. (Canada) won the gold medal, Christian Brothers College (United States) the silver, and St. Rose Parish (United States) the bronze. These results are the best that either Canada or the United States have achieved in men's Olympic football. The 1904 contest is considered to be an official contest by IOC, although not by FIFA because no national teams were involved in the competition.

Teams entered
 
 Galt F.C.
 
 Cadets of Christian Brothers College 
 St. Rose Parish

Competition schedule
The match schedule of the tournament.

Venue

Squads

Matches 
Galt F.C. had little difficulty with either of the U.S. squads, defeating them both without conceding a goal. The U.S. teams played a scoreless draw before Christian Brothers College won a rematch against St. Rose Parish, 2–0.

Final ranking

Medal summary

Medal table 
According to a report in the Toronto Mail and Empire newspaper of November 18, 1904, medals were awarded to the players in St. Louis.
The report states that "Immediately after the game, the Galt aggregation, numbering about 50 persons, retired to the office of James E. Sullivan, chief of the Department of Physical Culture, where they received their prize.  After a talk by Mr. James A. Conlon, of the Physical Culture Department, Mayor Mundy, of the City of Galt, presented each player on the winning team with a beautiful gold medal."
The medal awarded to Fred Steep of Galt, held by The Soccer Hall of Fame and Museum in Vaughan, Ontario, clearly shows that the medals were made in St. Louis, Missouri.

Medalists

Statistics

Goalscorers

References

 
1904 Summer Olympics events
1904
1904 in association football
Soccer in St. Louis
Summer Olympics 1904
1904–05 in American soccer